Man is the third solo studio album by Swedish singer Neneh Cherry, released on 2 September 1996 by Hut Records and Virgin Records. Three singles were issued from the album. Preceding the album release, a duet with Youssou N'Dour called "7 Seconds" was released as a single to promote Senegalese singer studio set  The Guide. Almost two years later, the common track was added also to the Cherry's album.

Track listing

Notes
  signifies an additional producer

Personnel
 Neneh Cherry – vocals
 Cameron McVey – Producer, beats, drums, keyboards
 Louis Pavlou – percussion, drums on "Kootchi"
 Gavyn Wright – string arrangements
 Mark Saunders – programming
 Wil Malone – string arrangements
 Jonny Stephens – electric guitar, Casio
 Steve "Grippa" Hopwood – guitar, backing vocals
 Jonny Dollar – guitar, programming, beats, string arrangements
 Paul Anthony Taylor – programming
 Youssou N'Dour – vocals on "7 Seconds"
 Christian "Falcon" Falk – producer, programming on "7 Seconds"
 Jonas Lindgren – violin on "7 Seconds"
 Kristoffer Wallman – keyboards on "7 Seconds"
 Bernard Butler – guitar on "Woman"
 Mickey P. Petralia – beats on "Woman"
 Mike Thompson – French horn on "Woman"
 Jeff Bryant – French horn on "Woman"
 Bill McDonald – bass, rhythm guitar, vocals on "Kootchi"
 Rich King – guitar on "Kootchi"
 Eagle-Eye Cherry – piano on "Trouble Man"
 Makoto Sakamoto – drums on "Hornbeam"
 Rudi Lagrilliere – guitar on "Golden Ring"

Charts

Weekly charts

Year-end charts

Certifications

References

1996 albums
Albums produced by Cameron McVey
Albums produced by David M. Allen
Albums produced by Jonny Dollar
Albums produced by Mark Saunders (record producer)
Alternative rock albums by Swedish artists
Hut Records albums
Neneh Cherry albums
Virgin Records albums
Worldbeat albums